Kha or Ha (Х х; italics: Х х) is a letter of the Cyrillic script. It looks the same as the Latin letter X (X x X x), in both uppercase and lowercase, both roman and italic forms, and was derived from the Greek letter Chi, which also bears a resemblance to both the Latin X and Kha.

History
The Cyrillic letter Kha was derived from the Greek letter Chi (Χ χ).

In the Cyrillic numeral system, Kha has a value of 600.

Usage

Russian
Kha is the twenty-third letter of the Russian alphabet. It represents the voiceless velar fricative  unless it is before a palatalizing vowel, when it represents .

Ossetian
Kha represents the voiceless uvular fricative  in Ossetian. The digraph ⟨хъ⟩ represents the voiceless uvular plosive .

Belarusian
Kha is also an alternative transliteration of the letter خ Ḫāʼ in the Arabic alphabet. This was used in Belarusian Arabic script, corresponding to the above Cyrillic letter.

Related letters and other similar characters
Χ χ : Greek letter Chi
Ξ ξ : Greek letter Ksi
H h : Latin letter H
J j : Latin letter J
X x : Latin letter X
ﺥ : Arabic letter Ḫāʾ
Һ һ : Cyrillic letter Shha
Ѯ ѯ : Cyrillic letter Ksi
ख़ : Devanagari letter Ḵẖa
ਖ਼ : Gurumukhi letter Ḵẖa

Computing codes

External links

Notes